Thaddeus Walter Cieslak (November 22, 1912 – May 9, 1993) was a Major League Baseball third baseman who played for the Philadelphia Phillies in 1944.

Cieslak was one of many ballplayers who only appeared in the major leagues during World War II. He made his major-league debut on April 18, 1944, in a home game against the Brooklyn Dodgers at Shibe Park.

In 85 games he was 54-for-220 (.245), and 21 walks and one hit-by-pitch pushed his on-base percentage up to .314.  He had 2 home runs, 11 runs batted in, and scored 18 runs.  Cieslak made 15 errors in 122 total chances (.877). In five of his games Cieslak was a left fielder, and handled 12 chances without making an error.

He died in his hometown of Milwaukee, Wisconsin at the age of 80.

External links 
Baseball Reference
Retrosheet

1912 births
1993 deaths
Atlanta Crackers players
Baseball players from Milwaukee
Fort Lauderdale Braves players
Indianapolis Indians players
Lakeland Pilots players
Major League Baseball third basemen
Nashville Vols players
Oklahoma City Indians players
Philadelphia Phillies players
Rayne Rice Birds players
Wilmington Blue Rocks players